Bouchercon is an annual convention of creators and devotees of mystery and detective fiction. It is named in honour of writer, reviewer, and editor Anthony Boucher; also the inspiration for the Anthony Awards, which have been issued at the convention since 1986. This page details Bouchercon XXIII and the 7th Anthony Awards ceremony.

Bouchercon
The convention was held in Toronto, Ontario, Canada on October 8, 1992; running until the 10th. The event was chaired by Al Navis, owner of the Toronto-based mystery book-store, Handy Book Exchange.

Special Guests
Lifetime Achievement award — Charlotte MacLeod
Guest of Honor — Margaret Millar
Toastmaster — Otto Penzler

Anthony Awards
The following list details the awards distributed at the seventh annual Anthony Awards ceremony.

Novel award
Winner:
Peter Lovesey, The Last Detective

Shortlist:
Susan Dunlap, Rogue Wave
Linda Grant, Love Nor Money
J. A. Jance, Hour of the Hunter
Nancy Pickard, I.O.U.
Marilyn Wallace, A Single Stone

First novel award
Winner:
Sue Henry, Murder on the Iditarod Trail

Shortlist:
Mary Cahill, Carpool
Margaret Lucke, A Relative Stranger
Rebecca Rothenberg, The Bulrush Murders
Leslie Watts, The Chocolate Box
Gloria White, Murder on the Run

Short story award
Winner:
Liza Cody, "Lucky Dip", from A Woman's Eye

Shortlist:
Linda Grant, "Last Rites", from Sisters in Crime 4
Wendy Hornsby, "Nine Sons", from Sisters in Crime 4
Margaret Maron, "Deborah's Judgment", from A Woman's Eye
Peter Lovesey, "The Crime of Miss Oyster Brown", from Ellery Queen's Mystery Magazine May 1991
Maxine O'Callaghan, "Wolf Winter", from Sisters in Crime 4

Critical / Non-fiction award
Winner:
Maxim Jakubowski, 100 Great Detectives

Shortlist:
Robert Adey, Locked Room Murders
Frankie Y. Bailey, Out of the Woodpile
Lesley Henderson, Twentieth Century Crime And Mystery Writers 3rd ed
Tony Hillerman, Talking Mysteries: A Conversation with Tony Hillerman
M. J. McCauley, Jim Thompson: Sleep with the Devil

True crime award
Winner:
David Simon, Homicide: A Year on the Killing Streets

Shortlist:
Vincent Bugliosi & Bruce Henderson, And the Sea Will Tell
Eileen Franklin & William Wright, Sins Of The father: The Landmark Franklin Case: a daughter, a memory, and a murder
Christopher Joyce & Eric Stover, Witnesses from the Grave: The Stories Bones Tell
Mark Lane, Plausible Denial
Joe McGinniss, Cruel Doubt

Short story collection / anthology award
Winner:
Sara Paretsky, A Woman's Eye

Shortlist:
Martin H. Greenberg & Ed Gorman, Cat Crimes
Cathleen Jordan, Alfred Hitchcock's Home Sweet Homicide
Charlotte MacLeod, Christmas Stalkings: Tales of Yuletide Murder
Eleanor Sullivan, Fifty Years of the Best from Ellery Queen's Mystery Magazine
Marilyn Wallace, Sisters in Crime 4

References

Anthony Awards
23
1992 in Canada